The Beast of Babylon Against the Son of Hercules (also known as Heroes of Babylon, Hero of Babylon and Goliath, King of Slaves) is a 1963 Italian-French peplum film written and directed  by Siro Marcellini and starring Gordon Scott.

The film is a fictionalized depiction of the Fall of Babylon (539 BCE), and depicts the historical rulers Belshazzar (as Balthazar) and Cyrus the Great (as Zairus).

Plot
When the high-born Nippur returns to Babylon following a long stay in Persia, he rescues slave-girl Tamira from the soldiers of the evil usurper, Balthazar. Nippur then pays a courtesy visit to Balthazar's court where he meets the high-priestess Ura who has ambitions to become queen and who casts a lustful eye on this new visitor. 

Later, shocked by the cruelty of Balthazar's reign and influenced by a group of rebels, Nippur interrupts a fiery sacrifice of virgins. Forced to flee Babylon, Nippur -- wounded by an arrow in the back -- is restored to health by the forces of the Persian king, Cyrus, who are marching toward Babylon. Nippur slips back into Babylon where he is captured and chained to a wall inside a dungeon. 

Using his great strength, Nippur breaks free, rescues Tamira before she can be sacrificed, and engages Balthazar in a sword fight to-the-death. The Persian army now arrives and Cyrus, before returning home, sees to it that Nippur sits on the throne of Babylon with the faithful Tamira by his side.

Cast

 Gordon Scott as Nippur 
 Geneviève Grad as  Tamira 
  Andrea Scotti as  Namar 
  Célina Cély as  Agar 
 Moira Orfei as  Ura 
 Mario Petri as  Zairus 
 Piero Lulli as  Balthazar 
 Andrea Aureli as  Anarsi 
 Giuseppe Addobbati as  Licardius  
 Harold Bradley as  Mursuk  
 Oreste Lionello  
 Consalvo Dell'Arti  
 Renato Malavasi

References

External links

French historical adventure films
Peplum films
1963 adventure films
Films directed by Siro Marcellini
Films set in the 6th century BC
Films set in Babylon
Sword and sandal films
Cultural depictions of Belshazzar
Cultural depictions of Cyrus the Great
1960s Italian films